Lady Lady is the debut studio album by Jamaican-American singer Masego. It was released on September 7, 2018 by EQT Recordings, LLC.

Background
In an interview with Billboard, Masego refers to the style of this album as TrapHouseJazz, and also said "my previous projects have different energy, and I feel like I’ve graduated to a more mature version of myself -- my beard’s almost connected, my man body’s comin’ in." The album guest features production from FKJ, SiR, Tiffany Gouché, and De' Wayne Jackson. Production was handled by Masego, Kojoa Asamoah, Jasper, Jah, Justin Bryant, Oliver Jonas Bergqvist, Sounwave, and French Kiwi Juice.

Promotion and singles
After filming a jam session in March, Masego and FKJ released the official single for "Tadow" on October 17, 2017. The song was fully improvised by the musicians during a day-long recording session that took place just after they first met. In celebration of his birthday, the second single "Lady Lady" was released on June 8, 2018. Two weeks before the album, the third single, "Old Age" featuring SiR was released.

Critical reception
Pitchfork gave the album a 7.3 out of 10 saying, "His music is sophisticated, steeped in 1980s quiet-storm R&B with hints of smooth jazz along the fringes," and "Lady Lady is a grand coming-of-age record that displays the playful and reflective halves of Masego, illuminating his versatile nature with the promise of more to come." Exclaim! also gave a positive review of the album saying, "when applied to his music, his penchant for jumping from place to place means big payoffs for his audience. On Lady Lady, no two songs sound alike, although they complement each other perfectly."

Track listing

Notes
 "Lady Lady" contains a sample of "Prototype" performed by Outkast
 "Sugar Walls" contains uncredited vocals from Ari Lennox
 "24 Hr. Relationship" contains uncredited vocals from Kehlani

References

2018 debut albums
Albums produced by Sounwave